The Equatorial Guinea women's national under-20 football team represents Equatorial Guinea in international youth women's football competitions.

The team competed in the women's tournament at the 2019 African Games held in Rabat, Morocco.

See also 
 Equatorial Guinea women's national football team

References 

under-20
African women's national under-20 association football teams